Wilpshire is a village and civil parish in the county of Lancashire, England. In the 2001 United Kingdom census, the parish had a population of 2,569, increasing to 2,582 at the 2011 Census.

The village is situated on the A666 Whalley Road, between the Brownhill area of Blackburn and the village of Langho.  The local railway station is Ramsgreave and Wilpshire, on the Ribble Valley Line with train services to Blackburn, Manchester and Clitheroe.

The only pub in the village is the Wilpshire Hotel, formerly known as The Red House.

Wilpshire Golf Club is a private golf club in the village, was founded in 1890. Originally it was a nine-hole course but extended to an eighteen-hole course in 1907. James Braid was commissioned to redesign the course. Most of the reconstruction took place before 1924. In 1995 the course was altered by a new 17th hole.

References

External links

Villages in Lancashire
Civil parishes in Lancashire
Geography of Ribble Valley